Cacova may refer to one of several places in Romania. In 1964, all but one were renamed.

Cacova, the former name of Livezile Commune, Alba County
Cacova, the former name of Grădinari Commune, Caraș-Severin County
Cacova, the former name of Neajlovu village, Morteni Commune, Dâmbovița County
Cacova, the former name of Piscu Mare village, Stoenești Commune, Vâlcea County
Cacova (river), a tributary of the Govora in Vâlcea County
Cacova Ierii, a village in Iara Commune, Cluj County
Cacova Sibiului, the former name of Fântânele village, Săliște Town, Sibiu County